Brigadier-General Alexander Travis Hawthorn (January 10, 1825May 31, 1899) was a senior officer of the Confederate States Army who commanded infantry in the Western and Trans-Mississippi theaters of the American Civil War.

Early life and education
Alexander Travis Hawthorn was born in Conecuh County, Alabama, on January 10, 1825 and was educated at Evergreen Academy and Mercer University. He then studied law at Yale University for two years, from 1846 to 1847, and relocated to Camden, Arkansas, where he commenced the practice of law.

American Civil War
When the 6th Arkansas Infantry Regiment was organized in 1861, Hawthorn was elected first its lieutenant-colonel and then, the following spring, was appointed its colonel. He was present at Battle of Shiloh and took a gallant part in the assault on Hindman Hill, in 1863, during the attack on Helena. In 1864 he led a brigade in Churchill's division, during the joint campaign of U.S. generals Banks and Steele; and was a participant in the Battle of Jenkins' Ferry. Meanwhile, he had been promoted brigadier-general from February 18, 1863. He continued in Churchill's division until the close of the war.

Later life
Hawthorn emigrated to Brazil in 1867, but returned to the United States in 1874 and engaged in business in Atlanta. Six years later he entered the Baptist ministry and was ordained, after which he lived in Texas until his death, 31 May 1899, at Dallas. He is buried in Greenwood Cemetery, Marshall, Texas.

See also
List of Confederate States Army generals
List of Mercer University alumni
List of people from Alabama
List of Yale Law School alumni

References

Further reading

External links

 
 

1825 births
1899 deaths
19th-century American businesspeople
19th-century American lawyers
19th-century Baptist ministers from the United States
6th Arkansas Infantry Regiment
39th Arkansas Infantry Regiment
American military personnel of the Mexican–American War
American expatriates in Brazil
Arkansas lawyers
Burials in Harrison County, Texas
Confederate States Army brigadier generals
Mercer University alumni
People from Camden, Arkansas
People from Conecuh County, Alabama
People from Marshall, Texas
People of Arkansas in the American Civil War
Yale Law School alumni
Military personnel from Texas